Oak Grove is a census-designated place in northern San Diego County, California, United States. It is home to the Oak Grove Butterfield Stage Station.

References

Unincorporated communities in California
Unincorporated communities in San Diego County, California